Margaret Helen Chutich (born June 18, 1958) is an American lawyer and judge who has served as an associate justice of the Minnesota Supreme Court since 2016, when she was appointed by Governor Mark Dayton. She previously served as a judge on the Minnesota Court of Appeals.

Chutich worked in the office of the Minnesota Attorney General and as an Assistant U.S. Attorney for the District of Minnesota. In 2008, she was appointed assistant dean of the Humphrey School of Public Affairs at the University of Minnesota. In 2011, Dayton appointed her to the appeals court.

Chutich is a graduate of Anoka High School, the University of Minnesota, and Michigan Law. She is married to Allina Health CEO Penny Wheeler, and is the first openly gay justice on the Minnesota Supreme Court. The couple had one child, Olivia Chutich, who was found dead outside a sorority house at Iowa State University on January 22, 2021.

See also 
 List of LGBT state supreme court justices in the United States
 List of LGBT jurists in the United States

References

|-

1958 births
Living people
Assistant United States Attorneys
LGBT judges
LGBT lawyers
Minnesota Court of Appeals judges
Justices of the Minnesota Supreme Court
University of Michigan Law School alumni
University of Minnesota faculty
LGBT people from Minnesota
21st-century American judges
LGBT appointed officials in the United States
21st-century American women judges
Anoka High School alumni
American women academics